The free-living nematode Panagrellus redivivus (sour paste nematode, or beer mat nematode from its occurrence in constantly moist felt beer mats), is known to many aquarium enthusiasts and fish keepers as the microworm. It is a tiny roundworm used as the first food for larger kinds of newly-hatched fish, such as larval common carp. The microworm is widely used in aquaculture as food for a variety of fish and crustacean species.

One of thirteen currently recognized species of Panagrellus, P. redivivus  is about 50 μm in diameter and just over 1 mm in length, barely visible to the naked eye. Subsisting on yeast, it is easily cultured at home on a substrate of flour paste or porridge inoculated with dry yeast. Females reach maturity in about three days and deliver live young rather than eggs, as most nematodes produce.

The microworm has been used in genetic analysis studies, but not nearly as universally as its relative, Caenorhabditis elegans.

In Vietnamese cuisine, using lactic fermented by yeast rice (cơm mẻ), which contains microworm (con mẻ), to make the sourness of dishes is common.

References

Further reading 

Batchelder, E., "Panagrellus redivivus" at Unity College Nematodes

External links 
Photos

Rhabditida
Pet foods
Nematodes described in 1767
Taxa named by Carl Linnaeus